Apamea cinefacta is a moth of the family Noctuidae first described by Augustus Radcliffe Grote in 1881. It is found in western North America, including in Washington and Alberta.

Subspecies
Apamea cinefacta albertae
Apamea cinefacta cinefacta

References

Apamea (moth)
Moths of North America
Moths described in 1881
Taxa named by Augustus Radcliffe Grote